The 19217 / 19218 Saurashtra Janta Express is an Express  train belonging to Indian Railways – Western Railway zone that runs between Bandra Terminus and  in India. From 15 June, 2022, it runs with highly refubrished LHB coaches

It operates as train number 19217 from Bandra Terminus to Veraval and as train number 19218 in the reverse direction, serving the states of Maharashtra & Gujarat. 

The train earlier used to run between Bandra Terminus and Jamnagar as 19017/19018, but due to the introduction of Jamnagar Humsafar and Hapa Duronto on the same route, railways decided to change its destination and improve the connectivity between Mumbai and Somnath.

Coach composition

The train consists of 22 coaches:

 1 AC first class
 2 AC 2-tier
 6 AC 3-tier
 8 Sleeper class
 3 Unreserved/General
 2 EOG cum Luggage Rake

Service

 19217 Bandra Terminus–Veraval Saurashtra Janta Express has an average speed of 52 km/hr and covers 913 km in 17h 40m.
 19218 Veraval–Bandra Terminus Saurashtra Janta Express has an average speed of 52 km/hr and covers 913 km in 17h 55m.

Route

Traction

It is now regularly hauled by a Vadodara-based WAP-5 / WAP-7 or Valsad-based WAP-4 electric locomotive until  handing over to a Sabarmati-based WDP-4D diesel locomotive which powers the train for the remainder of the journey.

Rake sharing

The train shares its rake with 12971/12972 Bandra Terminus–Bhavnagar Terminus Express.

References

External links

Transport in Mumbai
Transport in Jamnagar
Express trains in India
Rail transport in Gujarat
Rail transport in Maharashtra
Named passenger trains of India